Sergey Novikov is a Russian photographer based in Moscow. His series Breathless captured Soviet Union era cinemas.  Many are abandoned, crumbling or closing and others are getting redeveloped or torn down. The theaters captured include many examples of Constructivist architecture.

References

Russian photographers
Living people
Year of birth missing (living people)